Statistics of Swedish football Division 3 for the 1962 season.

League standings

Norra Norrland 1962

Mellersta Norrland 1962

Södra Norrland 1962

Norra Svealand 1962

Östra Svealand 1962

Västra Svealand 1962

Nordöstra Götaland 1962

Nordvästra Götaland 1962

Mellersta Götaland 1962

Sydöstra Götaland 1962

Sydvästra Götaland 1962

Södra Götaland 1962

Footnotes

References 

Swedish Football Division 3 seasons
3
Swed
Swed